Aberdeen is one of the 17 constituencies in the Southern District, Hong Kong.

The constituency returns one district councillor to the Southern District Council, with an election every four years.

Aberdeen constituency has an estimated population of 19,630.

Councillors represented

Election results

2010s

Notes

References

Aberdeen, Hong Kong
Constituencies of Hong Kong
Constituencies of Southern District Council
1999 establishments in Hong Kong
Constituencies established in 1999